A diabolo is a non-alcoholic mixed drink available in most restaurants and bars in France. It consists of a common lemonade mixed with syrup. Popular flavours include mint, strawberry, lemon or grenadine.

Origins 
The diabolo drink appeared before 1920, and became popular in France in the 1920s. The drink was around that time described as a mixture of a lemonade and a 'very light tincture of liqueur', a lemonade and a cassis liquor, or a lemonade and a syrup.

Translation in other languages 

Variants 
A diabolo flamand is a cocktail composed of jenever, lemonade and often a violet syrup.

Gallery

Popular culture 

 1977 : Diabolo menthe (Peppermint Soda), movie by Diane Kuris

See also 

 Lemonade

References 

Lemonade
Drinks